The Battle of Taza occurred in December 1553, it was a battle between the Regency of Algiers and the Saadi Sultanate. Salah Reis left 1,500 men in charge of the victorious operation against the Moroccan camp near Taza, which was protected by a Moroccan army composed of 30,000 cavalry, 10,000 infantry and 20 cannons.

The Wattasid Abou Hassan had sought intervention against the Sharif in Fez. In 1553 Salah Reis departed with 600 musketeers, 1,000 spahis and 4,000 horsemen from the Kingdom of Kuku. Salah Reis set out with his army in September and brought the Wattasid sovereign with him. When Salah Reis stopped at Tlemcen Mohammed al-Shaykh set up his headquarters at Taza with 30,000 cavalry, 10,000 infantry and 20 cannons. 

Salah Reis crossed the border and arrived in sight of the Moroccan camp in December. Salah Reis conducted a night attack against the Moroccan camp. The 1,500 men in charge of the operation performed perfectly as the attacking column routed the Arabs who were scared of the detonations. Salah Reis was able to defeat the Moroccans in the first confrontation at Taza.

The Sharif retreated to a height behind Taza and then retired to Fez in mid December. Salah Reis received a reinforcement of 600 men from the Wattasid sovereign and went with all of his forces to Oued Sebou, 6 kilometres from Fez. Another battle against the Moroccans took place at Qudyat-al-Mahali in the suburbs of Fez in January and Salah Reis was victorious.

References

1553 in Africa